The Traction Line Recreation Trail is a multi-use rail trail located in Morristown, New Jersey.

This  trail uses a rail corridor which was built for the Morris County Traction Company trolley line, which runs alongside New Jersey Transit's Morris & Essex Lines in Morris Township, New Jersey.

The trail is maintained by the Morris County Park Commission.

References

External links
  
  Morris County Parks

Protected areas of Morris County, New Jersey
Rail trails in New Jersey